Anita De Sosoo is a Ghanaian politician and the National Women's Organiser of the  National Democratic Congress (NDC) and former member of the National Disaster Management Organization. Anita De Sosoo gained popularity when as a panelist on Adom FM she stated that magical dwarfs were responsible for the poor economy. Anita de Soso received widespread condemnation in her native Ghana.

Anita De Sosoo later resigned from her post.

Education 
Anita has a first degree from Ghana Institute of Management and Public Administration and currently enrolled in the Law School.

References

Year of birth missing (living people)
Living people
National Democratic Congress (Ghana) politicians
Government ministers of Ghana
Women government ministers of Ghana
Ghana Institute of Management and Public Administration alumni